Luke Wattenberg (born September 10, 1997) is an American football guard for the Denver Broncos of the National Football League (NFL). He played college football at Washington and was drafted by the Broncos in the fifth round of the 2022 NFL Draft.

College career
Wattenberg was ranked as a fourstar recruit by 247Sports.com coming out of high school. He committed to Washington on April 15, 2015 over offers from USC, Utah, and Washington State.

Professional football

Wattenberg was drafted by the Denver Broncos with the 171st pick in the fifth round of the 2022 NFL Draft.

References

External links
Denver Broncos bio
 Washington Huskies bio

1997 births
Living people
Players of American football from California
Sportspeople from Orange County, California
American football offensive linemen
Washington Huskies football players
Denver Broncos players